USNS Rollins (T-AG-189) was one of 12 ships scheduled to be acquired by the United States Navy in February 1966 and converted into forward depot ships and placed into service with the Military Sea Transport Service. SS High Point Victory (MCV-851) was chosen for this conversion and assigned the name Rollins but the program was canceled and the ships were not acquired by the Navy.

SS High Point Victory was a Victory ship which were designed to replace the earlier Liberty ships. Liberty ships were designed to be used just for World War II. Victory ships were designed to last longer and serve the US Navy after the war. The Victory ship differed from a Liberty ship in that they were: faster, longer and wider, taller, a thinner stack set farther toward the superstructure and had a long raised forecastle.

World War II
SS High Point Victory was built for the U.S. Maritime Commission during the final months of World War II under the Emergency Shipbuilding program. High Point Victory was complete and give to the Maritime Commission on 28 September 1945. High Point Victory was named for High Point, North Carolina. High Point Victory was operated by the American Foreign Steamship Corporation. With the Surrender of Japan on 2 September 1945, she was not needed for the war. For World War II High Point Victory was operated by the American Foreign SS Company under the United States Merchant Marine act for the War Shipping Administration. The vessel was used for war transportation. After the completion of post war work in 1947 she was laid up at the Reserve Fleet at Wilmington.

Korean War
SS High Point served as merchant marine ship supplying goods for the Korean War. About 75 percent of the personnel taken to Korea for the Korean War came by the merchant marine ship. High Point Victory transported goods, mail, food and other supplies. About 90 percent of the cargo was moved by merchant marine to the war zone. High Point Victory made trips between 1950 and 1952, helping American forces engaged against Communist aggression in South Korea. In 1952 she was returned to the National Defense Reserve Fleet.

Vietnam War 
In 1966 she was reactivated for the Vietnam War as a  Merchant Marine operated by the States SS Company. After the war in 1973 she was laid up at the Reserve Fleet in Beaumont, Texas.

In 1994 she was scrapped at Alang, India.

References
 

Victory ships
Ships built in Sparrows Point, Maryland
1945 ships
Merchant ships of the United States
Cancelled ships of the United States Navy